The Family of the Vourdalak  is  a gothic novella by Aleksey Konstantinovich Tolstoy, written in 1839 in French and originally entitled La Famille du Vourdalak. Fragment inedit des Memoires d'un inconnu. Tolstoy wrote it on a trip to France from Frankfurt, where he was attached to the Russian Embassy.

It was translated into Russian by Boleslav Markevich, as "Семья вурдалака" (Sem'yá vurdaláka), published for the first time in The Russian Messenger in January 1884. The original French text appeared in print in 1950, in Revue des Études Slavs, vol.26. The Reunion After Three Hundred Years (Les Rendez-vous Dans Trois Cent Ani) which was written at about the same time and which might be regarded as a sequel (for protagonist Marquis d'Urfe and Countess Grammon appear in it) first appeared in a compilation Le Poete Alexis Tolstoi by A.Lirondelle (Paris, 1912).

The word vourdalak occurs first in Pushkin's work in the early 19th century, and was taken up in Russian literary language following Pushkin. It is a distortion of words referring to vampires (originally probably to werewolves) in Slavic and Balkan folklore – cf. Slavic vǎlkolak, volkodlak, volkolak, vukodlak, wurdulak, etc.; Romanian Vârcolac; and Greek Vrykolakas (both borrowed from the Slavic term).

Plot summary
Marquis d'Urfé, a young French diplomat, finds himself in a small Serbian village, in the house of an old peasant named Gorcha. The host is absent: he left the house ten days ago along with some other men to hunt for a Turk outlaw, Alibek. Upon leaving he told his sons, Georges and Pierre, that they should wait for him for ten days sharp and, should he come a minute later, kill him by driving a stake through his heart for then he’d be not a man but a vourdalak (vampire).

The day Marquis comes to the village is the tenth day of Gorcha's absence. The family awaits the hour with growing anxiety and there he is, appearing on the road at 8 o'clock in the evening, exactly on the time he left ten days ago. His sons are uncertain as to how this strange precision should be interpreted. Georges suspects his father became a vourdalak, Pierre insists otherwise. Then Georges' son dies inexplicably. The French diplomat has to leave the house and continue his travel.

Half a year later on his way back from his mission, d'Urfé returns to the village only to find it abandoned. Coming to the familiar house he stays for the night, being allured by Sdenka, Gorcha's daughter he fell for during his first visit, who appears to dwell in the empty house. The moment comes when the Frenchman realizes he's fallen under the charms of a vampire. He makes an attempt to leave, comes under a massive attack of vourdalaks, all of the Gorcha family among them, and makes a miraculous escape, having to thank his own good luck and the agility of his horse.

In film
The novella became the basis for "I Wurdulak", one of the three parts of Mario Bava's 1963 film Black Sabbath, featuring Boris Karloff. The 1972 Italian/Spanish film The Night of the Devils was also based on Tolstoy's story. A glancing reference to the novella occurs in Guy Wilson's 2012 film, Werewolf: The Beast Among Us; when an undead victim of a werewolf attack arises and is shot by the grandson of the Great Hunter who exclaims, "I hate goddamn Vourdalaks."

English translation
Vampires: Stories of the Supernatural, Hawthorn Books, 1973.

Notes

References

External links 
 Семья вудалака. The Russian text.

1884 Russian novels
Works by Aleksey Konstantinovich Tolstoy
Vampire novels
Works originally published in The Russian Messenger
Russian novels adapted into films
Russian Gothic novels
Novels set in Serbia
Fiction set in 1769